Mount Moreland is a small community located in the eThekwini municipality in KwaZulu-Natal, South Africa.

The community is known as being the location of an important roosting site for the European barn swallow and accordingly attracts visitors to the area mid October to mid April.

References

Populated places in eThekwini Metropolitan Municipality